The Union Association was a Class D level Minor league baseball circuit that operated from  through , with franchises based in Idaho, Montana and Utah. It was unrelated to the like-named 1884 major league.

History
Beginning play in 1914, the Union Association was classified as a Class D league, based in the Rocky Mountains of the Western United States. The 1911 charter members were the Great Falls Electrics, Salt Lake City Skyscrapers, Butte Miners, Boise Irrigators, Helena Senators and Missoula.

Frank Huelsman was a star player in the league, completing the Triple Crown in 1911 and 1913, while winning 3 of the 4 league batting titles. The Salt Lake City, Helena and Ogden franchises played for the entire duration of the Union Association. On July 20, 1914, Boise and Murray disbanded, then on August 5, 1914 Butte dropped out, which led to the disbandment of the entire league. Despite the rest of the league disbanding, Salt Lake City and Ogden played 16 games against each other to complete their seasons.

Teams

Champions

Standings & statistics
1911 Union Association - schedule
 

1912 Union Association - schedule

 
1913 Union Association - schedule
 

1914 Union Association - schedule
Boise and Murray disbanded July 20; Butte disbanded August 5; League disbanded August 5.Ogden & Salt Lake played 16 games with each other to complete their seasons; Ogden won 10 games and Salt Lake won 6. Playoff: Ogden 4, Salt Lake 2.

References

Sources
The ESPN Baseball Encyclopedia – Gary Gillette, Peter Gammons, Pete Palmer. Publisher: Sterling Publishing (NY), 2007. Format: Paperback, 1824 pp. Language: English. 

Defunct minor baseball leagues in the United States
1911 establishments in the United States
1914 disestablishments in the United States
Baseball leagues in Idaho
Baseball leagues in Utah
Baseball leagues in Montana
Sports leagues established in 1911
Sports leagues disestablished in 1914